Panasonic Lumix DMC-GF5 is the ninth camera in Panasonic's Lumix G-series adhering to the Micro Four Thirds System (MFT) design standard.

See also 
 Panasonic Lumix DMC-GF1
 Panasonic Lumix DMC-GF2
 Panasonic Lumix DMC-GF3

References

External links
 Panasonic Lumix DMC-GF5 Product site
 Panasonic Lumix GF5 Hands On - engadget.com

GF5